Route 293 is a rural road that connects Highway 40 to Netivot and to Route 34 and Highway 25. Many Kibbutzim and Moshavim are along its path.

Junctions on the route 

293